Sumreri (शुमलेंडी, सुमरेरी/سومرےری)  is a locality in Sagar district, Madhya Pradesh in central India.

The railway station of Sumreri is known as "Khurai Sumreri" which halts local and passenger trains running on the Bina–Katni rail route.

References